Wheatland is a borough in Mercer County, Pennsylvania, United States, along the Shenango River. The population was 583 at the 2020 census. It is part of the Youngstown-Warren metropolitan area.

Wheatland suffered catastrophic damage on May 31, 1985, when an F5 tornado struck the area. In Wheatland, over 100 buildings were leveled, and 18 fatalities are associated with this tornado, with most being in Niles, Ohio.

Geography
Wheatland is located at  (41.200389, -80.495709).

Demographics

As of the census of 2000, there were 748 people, 349 households, and 202 families residing in the borough. The population density was 847.8 people per square mile (328.2/km2). There were 379 housing units at an average density of 429.6 per square mile (166.3/km2). The racial makeup of the borough was 85.96% White, 12.03% African American, 0.13% Asian, 0.13% from other races, and 1.74% from two or more races. Hispanic or Latino of any race were 1.07% of the population.

There were 349 households, out of which 17.8% had children under the age of 18 living with them, 41.5% were married couples living together, 11.2% had a female householder with no husband present, and 42.1% were non-families. 38.1% of all households were made up of individuals, and 20.9% had someone living alone who was 65 years of age or older. The average household size was 2.14 and the average family size was 2.85.

In the borough the population was spread out, with 18.3% under the age of 18, 5.5% from 18 to 24, 25.8% from 25 to 44, 22.7% from 45 to 64, and 27.7% who were 65 years of age or older. The median age was 46 years. For every 100 females there were 85.1 males. For every 100 females age 18 and over, there were 82.9 males.

The median income for a household in the borough was $27,596, and the median income for a family was $34,250. Males had a median income of $30,521 versus $18,409 for females. The per capita income for the borough was $15,365. About 8.3% of families and 14.4% of the population were below the poverty line, including 21.4% of those under age 18 and 12.7% of those age 65 or over.

Broadcast media

Television 
Because of Wheatland's location near the Pennsylvania/Ohio border, it is served by WKBN-TV (CBS), WFMJ-TV (NBC), WYTV (ABC), WYFX-LD (Fox) and WBCB (CW), all broadcast from nearby Youngstown, OH.

Radio 
Wheatland is served by AM radio stations such as WPIC (790 AM) (Sharon, PA), WKBN (570 AM) (Youngstown, OH) and FM radio stations such as WYFM/"Y-103" (102.9 FM) (Sharon, PA), WLLF/"The River" (96.7 FM) (Mercer, PA), WYLE/"Willie 95.1" (95.1 FM) (Grove City, PA), WMXY/"Mix 98.9" (98.9 FM) (Youngstown, OH).

References

External links

Wheatland, PA/city-data

Boroughs in Mercer County, Pennsylvania
Populated places established in 1865